Black Heat is the debut album by funk group Black Heat, produced by Joel Dorn and released in 1972.

Track listing

Personnel
Johnell Gray - Organ, Vocals
Naamon Jones - Bass, Vocals
Bradley Owens - Guitar, Vocals
Esco Cromer - Drums
Phil Guilbeau - Trumpet
King Raymond Green - Congas, Harmonica, Vocals
David "Fathead" Newman - Tenor Sax

References

External links
 Black Heat-Black Heat at Discogs

1972 debut albums
Atlantic Records albums